Ase may refer to:
 Ase, Nigeria, a town in Delta State, Nigeria
 -ase, a suffix used for the names of enzymes
 Aṣẹ, a West African philosophical concept 
 American Sign Language (ISO 639-3 code: ase)

See also
 Åse (disambiguation)
 ASE (disambiguation)